Peau d'Espagne ("skin of Spain") is a perfume made of flower and spice oils. Traditionally employed to scent leather, it is also used as a perfume for women and to flavor dishes.

Scent
British sexologist Havelock Ellis esteemed peau d'espagne as "a highly complex and luxurious perfume, often the favorite scent of sensuous persons" and noted that "it is said by some, probably with a certain degree of truth, that Peau d'Espagne is of all perfumes that which most nearly approaches the odor of a woman's skin; whether it also suggests the odor of leather is not so clear".

Use
As first employed in the sixteenth century, peau d'espagne was composed primarily of rose, neroli, sandalwood, lavender, verbena, bergamot, clove and cinnamon oil, as well as civet and musk. Leather steeped in it was also used to perfume stationery and clothing.

Since 1910, with the addition of vanilla, tonka, styrax, and geranium, peau d'espagne is also employed as a perfume for women. According to perfumer Mandy Aftel, it has "lost none of its sensuous appeal over the decades" and is an exception to the "generally tame and uninspired" floral blends of the turn of the 19th century.

In cooking, peau d'espagne can be used to flavor meat dishes or beverages to impart an exotic aroma.

Composition
The 1872 Encyclopedia Of Practical Receipts And Processes by William B. Dick describes the composition and production of peau d’Espagne as follows:

In culture
The scent gave its name to a 1933 comedy in four acts by the French writer Jean Sarment.

The British poet Arthur Symons published a poem titled Peau d'Espagne in his 1913 collection Knave of Hearts. It concludes:

Peau d'Espagne, scent of sex, that brings
To mind those ways wherein I went,
Perhaps I might forget these things
But for that infamy, your scent!

References

Perfumes